The 1993–94 season was Port Vale's 82nd season of football in the English Football League, and fifth successive (37th overall) season in the Second Division. They won promotion to the First Division as the division's runners-up, just one point away from champions Reading. In the FA Cup, John Rudge's men caused an upset by defeating top-flight Southampton, before they exited at the Fourth Round. Vale were knocked out of the League Cup at the First Round, and the League Trophy at the Area Quarter-finals.

Overview

Second Division
The pre-season saw John Rudge sign left-back Allen Tankard from Wigan Athletic for £87,500. Experienced forward Keith Houchen was allowed to join Hartlepool United on a free transfer, and Paul Kerr signed with Leicester City.

The season opened with a 2–1 defeat to Burnley at Turf Moor. Though the season really got going for the Vale with their opening home game, as they recorded a 6–0 win over Barnet despite an early sending off for Peter Billing, both Martin Foyle and Bernie Slaven bagging hat-tricks. This however would be the only victory in the first seven league games. In September, Steve Livingstone joined the club on loan from Chelsea. Then in October, Canadian Ollie Heald signed from Norvan, having impressed whilst on trial. Vale shot up the table with eight victories in ten games. In January, Aidan Newhouse arrived on loan from Wimbledon, but only played two games. In February, Bernie Slaven left the club for Darlington. The next month Rudge brought Joe Allon to the club after Allon left Brentford. He also signed winger David Lowe on loan from Leicester City. Vale picked up four clean sheets in the first five games of March, but ended the month with two defeats. They had a solid April, winning six of their eight games, with Foyle scoring a hat-trick past Leyton Orient at Brisbane Road on 4 April. Two victories from their final two games of the season ensured promotion.

They finished in second-placed with 88 points, despite having finished third the previous season with 89 points. Top-scorer was Martin Foyle with eighteen goals, though Ian Taylor and Nicky Cross also hit double figures.

At the end of the season, star midfielder Ian Taylor was sold to Sheffield Wednesday for £1 million (plus add-ons). The club also sold Peter Swan to Plymouth Argyle for £300,000. Also leaving the club were Nicky Cross and Trevor Wood, who joined Hereford United and Walsall respectively.

Finances
The club's shirt sponsors were Tunstall Assurance.

Cup competitions
In the FA Cup, Vale brushed aside Blackpool (2–0) and Huddersfield Town (1–0). Drawn against Premier League Southampton in the Third Round, the "Valiants" earned a 1–1 draw at The Dell with an Andy Porter goal. Back at Burslem, Vale achieved a giantkilling with a Bernie Slaven goal. In the Fourth Round they faced First Division Wolverhampton Wanderers at Molineux, and were defeated 2–0.

In the League Cup, Vale exited at the First Round to Third Division Lincoln City on away goals, having drawn 2–2 at Vale Park and 0–0 at Sincil Bank.

In the League Trophy, Vale reached the Area Quarter-finalists. They would not enter the competition again until 2000–01.

League table

Results
Port Vale's score comes first

Football League Second Division

Results by matchday

Matches

FA Cup

League Cup

League Trophy

Player statistics

Appearances

Top scorers

Transfers

Transfers in

Transfers out

Loans in

Loans out

References
Specific

General
Soccerbase

Port Vale F.C. seasons
Port Vale